Guayabo National Monument, is an archaeological site near the city of Turrialba, within the Central Conservation Area in the Cartago Province, Costa Rica. It is almost directly in the center of the country on the Southern slope of the Turrialba Volcano. Only a small portion of it has been unearthed, excavated, and studied.

History
Guayabo de Turrialba seems to have been a locus of social power in the wake of this período de integración. It was initially populated beginning in about 1000 BCE, and then abandoned in 1400 CE, a century before the Spanish arrived, for reasons that remain a mystery. Researchers still to this day have not found any sign of why people might have left. Although, there is speculation that it might have had to do with something like disease or rival civilizations. It has been estimated that there were about 10,000 people who were residents. Believed to be the home of the Pre-Columbian people, this relic site was first discovered in the 1800s and was first excavated in the year of 1882. What has been found and what the site consists of is the city's infrastructure, petroglyphs, tombs, and artifacts that were left behind and found by archaeologists in the 1960s during further excavations. To be more specific, the magnitude of the known part of the site, presumed to be its central portion, consists of 43 stone foundations, three aqueducts, two major roadways, dozens of smaller paths, and some stone tombs. The people of Guayabo were known to be well aware of good engineering, which can be assumed by their use of aqueducts. Most of the site consists of the circular mounds that the conical wooden structures were once built on. Side note; the villagers used to live in huge communal-like conical houses with thatched roofs with most, if not all, of their family members. One mound in particular, Mound 1, stands out as it is the largest one of this culture and it is located in the center of the village. To its front runs a paved road which connected the surrounding settlements, with it as far as 9km. That is considered the most impressive finding at the site. Architecturally, back in the day, the main building probably served as both a symbol as well as a place to conduct public business.  After ascending the stairs next to the center mound, visitors would have been greeted by a matching pair of structures, rectangular in shape. These were probably guardhouses that flank the road at this point and would have controlled access to the settlement. A lot of the artifacts found when excavating, such as the stones and petroglyphs, represented animals such as jaguars and lizards. There were tools that were found that suggested that Guayabo had people dedicated to growing agriculture which mainly consisted of roots such as yucca. Studies have shown that the people of Guayabo did most of their own work although there is some data suggesting slavery may have been practiced.

Excavations and Visiting the Site Today
Following an 1891 excavation of a cemetery, over 100 artifacts were displayed at the 1892 Historical American Exposition in Madrid and then much of the display was taken to the 1893 World's Columbian Exposition in Chicago, Illinois. The explorers who excavated this site include Anastacio Alfaro, Carlos Aguilar, Oscar Fonseca, and Sergio Chávez. There have been studies done on Guayabo that use today's technologies, such as one recent study using remote sensing techniques to detect and map the roads in the region. As of 2020 no studies conducted using LIDAR have been made. In 2009, Guayabo was declared an "International Historic Civil Engineering Landmark" by the American Society of Civil Engineers because its roads, walls and water channels represent remarkable civil engineering achievements by a pre-Columbian civilization. The site is open to the public daily and is a tourist attraction. It has been open to the public since August 13, 1973. One can hike around the trails and observe the structures or tour it with a professional guide. This is a popular destination to visit because although Guayabo is similar to other excavated sites such as Machu Picchu, Chichen Itza, and other South American and Central American ruins in the sense that the artifacts and structures that can be found look similar, it draws the public in due to the mystery of why it was abandoned, and the fact that there is still a big portion of it that has not yet been excavated. It is also sought out by people because of its remoteness in the rain forest.

Current State
The current state of the structure is in good shape. Everything has been preserved well and kept as authentic as possible. It is now protected within the Guayabo National Monument and is also a part of the Central Volcanic Conservation Area. Keeping this site clean and authentic is a big priority to the people of Costa Rica and especially those Costa Ricans who live near it not only because it brings in tourism but they also really value the environment. With Costa Rica being the most environmental conscious country in the world, it is not a surprise that they want to keep it clean. It also helps that unlike other sites such as Machu Picchu where it gets over half a million visitors each year, Guayabo de Turrialba does not receive nearly as many visitors because it is not as popular so it is easier to maintain. There are measures being taken to make sure it stays the condition it is in today stays the same for the future.

Gallery

References

External links
 Guayabo National Monument at Costa Rica National Parks
 Costa Rican lost city of Guayabo

History of Costa Rica
Archaeological sites in Costa Rica
Former populated places in Costa Rica
Historic Civil Engineering Landmarks
Buildings and structures in Cartago Province
Protected areas of Costa Rica
Geography of Cartago Province